Pseudochromis tauberae, the lightheaded dottyback, is a species of ray-finned fish 
which is found from Madagascar and Kenya to Sodwana Bay in South Africa in the western Indian Ocean. which is a member of the family Pseudochromidae.

References

tauberae
Taxa named by Roger Lubbock
Fish described in 1977
Fish of the Indian Ocean